Voiceserve Inc. is a Delaware, USA telecommunications and softswitch company headquartered in Middlesex, United Kingdom and incorporated December 9, 2005. The company offers Voice Over IP (VoIP), mobility, and IP-PBX software with management, administration, billing, mobility, hosted IP-PBX, and softphone functionality found among its services, VoipSwitch, Call-to-PBX, and Vippie.

History

Background
The co-founders of Voiceserve are Michael Bibelman (CEO) and Alexander Ellinson (Chairman of the Board of Directors and President). Krzysztof Oglaza is the chief technical officer of VoipSwitch which Voiceserve acquired in 2008.

Awards
 Voiceserve's Voipswitch Vippie mobile SIP softphone won the 2009 Unified Communications TMC Labs Award.
 VoipSwitch VOD (video on demand) won the 2011 TMC IPTV Excellence Award.

References

VoIP companies of the United States